System Floors (UK) Ltd v Daniel [1982] ICR 54 is a UK labour law case, concerning the construction of terms in a contract of employment.

Facts
Written particulars mistakenly stated Mr Daniel started a week earlier than he in fact did. He claimed unfair dismissal, and the employer argued he did not satisfy the qualifying period for his claim.<ref>H Collins, K Ewing and A McColgan, Labour Law: Texts, Cases and Materials (Hart 2005) 139</ref>

The Tribunal found that the employer was bound by the statement made in the contract.

Judgment
Browne-Wilkinson J overturned the Tribunal, and held that Mr Daniel did not satisfy the statutory qualifying period for unfair dismissal, and the mistaken statement of the employment contract did not estop the employer. He quoted Turriff Construction Ltd v Bryant (1967) ITR 292, where Lord Parker said ‘It is of course quite clear that the statement made pursuant to s.4 of the Act of 1963 is not a contract. It is not even conclusive evidence of the terms of a contract.’ This was followed in Parkes Classic Confectionery Ltd v Ashcroft (1973) 8 ITR 43, where the Divisional Court overruled an Industrial Tribunal holding that a contract had been varied, the employer failed to serve particulars and the employer was not entitled to rely on the varied contract. The contract was still variable, despite failure to serve particulars. The effect of a written statement would therefore be persuasive evidence of the contract to a court, but it would not be binding.

See also

UK labour lawRobertson v British Gas Corp [1983] ICR 351, confirmed the statement is just evidence.Kampelmann v Landschaftsverband Westfalen-Lippe (1998) C-253/96, [1998] IRLR 333 takes the same approach.

Notes

References
H Collins, K Ewing and A McColgan, Labour Law: Texts, Cases and Materials (Hart 2005)

Employment Appeal Tribunal cases
1982 in case law
1982 in British law